Alexis Golfinos (born 24 November 2004) is a Greek professional footballer who plays as a forward for Super League 2 club AEK Athens B.

References

2004 births
Living people
Greek footballers
Super League Greece 2 players
AEK Athens F.C. players
Association football forwards
Footballers from Patras
AEK Athens F.C. B players